This is a list of films produced by the Nepal Bhasa language film industry based in Nepal.

List of Nepal Bhasa films

See also
 List of foreign films shot in Nepal

References

External links
 Nepali Movies